Central Lake may refer to a location in the United States:

 Central Lake, Michigan, a village
 Central Lake Township, Michigan

See also
 Central Lakes, Minnesota